Changzhou Olympic Sports Centre (Simplified Chinese: 常州奥林匹克体育中心) is a sport complex in Changzhou, China.  It is currently used mostly for various events, like concerts and athletics. The main stadium holds 38,000 people. The complex also includes the 6,200 seater Xincheng Gymnasium, an aquatic centre with 2,300 seats, and a 4,400 m2 indoor tennis hall. Association football club Changzhou Tianshan use the venue for home games.

References

Football venues in China
Indoor arenas in China
Handball venues in China
Badminton venues
Sports venues in Jiangsu
Buildings and structures in Changzhou
Sports venues completed in 2008
2008 establishments in China
Sports complexes in China